Tiny Engines is an American record label based in the Carolinas.

Controversy
In November 2019, Stevie Knipe of Adult Mom accused Tiny Engines of a breach of contract due to the delayed payment of $8,000 in royalties. Knipe claimed that Tiny Engines sent no royalty payments between 2015 and May 2018 to the band. Other artists such as Mannequin Pussy and Christian Holden claimed to have experienced similar circumstances. The co-founder of the record label, Chuck Daley, admitted to the delay of payments in an interview with Billboard.

Current artists
Adult Mom
Alien Boy
awakebutstillinbed
Club Night
Eerie Gaits
Emperor X
Empty Country
Faye
floral print
Haybaby
It Looks Sad.
Jouska
Long Neck
Look Mexico
Mannequin Pussy
Museum Mouth
Nanami Ozone
Oceanator
Peaer
Pendant
Personal Space
Restorations
Runaway Brother
See Through Dresses
Sinai Vessel
Somos
The Spirit of the Beehive
Strange Ranger
Summer Cannibals
The Hotelier
Truth Club
Wild Pink

Former artists
Annabel
Beach Slang
Best Practices
Cattle Drums
Cayetana
CSTVT 
Dikembe
Direct Effect
Everyone Everywhere
Frontier(s)
Illuminati Hotties
Jowls
Little Big League
Monument
Places to Hide
Red collar
Run Forever
Save Ends
Signals Midwest
Springtime
State Faults
State Lines
Strange Relations
Sweet John Bloom
Thelma
Tigers Jaw
Walleater
Wavelets
Weller
Yeesh

References

American record labels
American independent record labels
Tiny Engines